The Hawaii–Wyoming football rivalry is an American college football rivalry between the Hawaii Rainbow Warriors and Wyoming Cowboys. The rivalry began in 1978, when Hawaii joined the Western Athletic Conference, and was played annually until 1997, shortly before Wyoming departed from the WAC and joined the newly formed Mountain West Conference. The rivalry was renewed in 2012 when Hawaii joined the MW as a football-only affiliate member. The teams have met 26 times, with Wyoming leading the series 16–11.

Paniolo Trophy
The Paniolo Trophy was the trophy that went to the winner of the game. Paniolo is a Hawaiian word meaning “cowboy”, and the trophy featured a bronze cowboy on horseback, twirling a lariat. The trophy was donated to the two schools by the Wyoming Paniolo Society, a group of Hawaii residents with Wyoming roots. However, neither team was able to locate the original Paniolo Trophy before the rivalry was reinstated; this led to a new replacement trophy being created based on photographs of the original.

Game results

See also  
 List of NCAA college football rivalry games

References

College football rivalries in the United States
Hawaii Rainbow Warriors football
Wyoming Cowboys football